Ink Master: Peck vs Nuñez is the eighth season of the tattoo reality competition Ink Master that premiered on August 23 and concluded on December 6, 2016, on Spike with 16 episodes. The show is hosted and judged by Jane's Addiction guitarist Dave Navarro, with accomplished tattoo artists Chris Núñez and Oliver Peck serving as series regular judges. The winner will receive a $100,000 prize, a feature in Inked Magazine, a Dodge Charger, a guest spot at their respective team captain's shop (Oliver Peck's Elm Street Tattoo in Dallas, Texas or Chris Nuñez's Handcrafted in Ft. Lauderdale, Florida) and the title of Ink Master. 

The premise of this season was Núñez and Peck going head-to-head for the first time in Ink Master history where thirty artists battled for a spot on either team, with both teams consisting of nine artists each. The first seven episodes featured each team battling their own members in an elimination-style competition for a spot in the top ten. Then, the top five artists on Team Núñez battled Team Peck's top five artists.

The winner of the eighth season of Ink Master was Ryan Ashley Malarkey, who became the first female winner in the competition, with Gian Karle Cruz being the runner-up.

Judging and ranking

Judging Panel
The judging panel is the table of three primary judges. They will vote to see who had the best tattoo of the day and who will be eliminated as well as choosing the winner of Ink Master.

Jury of Peers
The team that is safe from elimination will put one artist from the opposing team up for elimination. They will then explain to the judges why that artist was chosen. From the tenth episode onwards, all the artists will critique each other's work.

Contestants
The first episode introduces 30 contestants who competed in a two-part elimination tattoo marathon with each part narrowing down to 26 and 22 artists respectively. Nuñez and Peck then picked the first five artists to be on their respective team. The remaining 12 artists competed again to earn a spot on Team Nuñez or Team Peck. The official 18 artists for this season were split into two teams of 9 artists.

Names, experience, and cities stated are at time of filming.

Chosen

Not chosen

Contestant progress
 Indicates the contestant was a part of Team Nuñez.
 Indicates the contestant was a part of Team Peck.

  The contestant won Ink Master.
 The contestant was the runner-up.
 The contestant finished third in the competition.
 The contestant advanced to the finale
 The contestant won Best Tattoo of the Day.
 The contestant was among the top.
 The contestant received positive critiques.
 The contestant received mixed critiques.
 The contestant received negative critiques.
 The contestant was in the bottom.
 The contestant was put in the bottom by the Jury of Peers.
 The contestant was eliminated from the competition.
 The contestant was put in the bottom by the Jury of Peers and was eliminated from the competition.
 The contestant quit the competition.
 The contestant returned as a guest for that episode.

Episodes

References

External links
 
 
 

2016 American television seasons
Ink Master